National Lotteries Board also known NLB (formerly known as Hospital Lottery) government own national lottery company. Founded in 1955, under Finance Act No.4 of 1955 under the Minister of Health was the Major Edward A. Nugawela. (1947–1958).  National Lotteries Board resisted under Finance Act no.11 of 1963. NLB number total agency network approximated 3,000. In 2017 National Lotteries Board fully operated by Ministry of Finance. NLB, earn Rs. 17.5 billion in 2015. Sri Lanka government one of main revenue but since 2018 revenue decreased. Revenue decreased by 18% in 2018.

Lotteries 
Several games operate under the NLB brand:

 GOVISETHA
 MAHAJANA SAMPATHA
 DHANA NIDHANAYA
 DARU DIRI SAMPATHA
 JATHIKA SAMPATHA
 VASANA SAMPATHA
 SEVANA

References 

State owned commercial corporations of Sri Lanka

Lotteries in Sri Lanka